Rumex hymenosepalus, commonly known as canaigre, canaigre dock, ganagra, wild rhubarb, Arizona dock, and tanner's dock, is a perennial flowering plant which is native to the North American deserts in the southwestern United States and northern Mexico. It is a common food plant of the ruddy copper larvae.

Uses
It has been cultivated in the southwestern United States for the roots, a good source of tannin, which is used in leather tanning. It also yields a warm, medium brown dye.  
The leaves and leaf stalks are considered edible when young, the older leaf stalks cooked and eaten like rhubarb, which is in the same plant family.

Taxonomy
Rumex hymenosepalus was first described by American botanist John Torrey in the Report on the United States and Mexican Boundary in 1859.

Synonyms
 Rumex arizonicus Britton
 Rumex salinus A. Nelson
 Rumex hymenosepalus var. salinus (A. Nelson) Rech.
 Rumex saxei nom. nudum. UNAM

References

External links

 
 
 
 
 The Jepson Manual eFlora (TJM2) treatment of Rumex hymenosepalus

hymenosepalus
Flora of the Southwestern United States
Flora of the South-Central United States
Flora of Baja California
Flora of California
Flora of Chihuahua (state)
Flora of Colorado
Flora of the California desert regions
Flora of the Great Basin
Natural history of the California chaparral and woodlands
Natural history of the Mojave Desert
Natural history of the Peninsular Ranges
Natural history of the Transverse Ranges
Plants used in traditional Native American medicine
Taxa named by John Torrey